Coleophora chamaedriella is a moth of the family Coleophoridae. It is found from Poland to Spain, Sardinia, Italy and Greece.

The larvae feed on Teucrium chamaedrys, Teucrium scorodonia and Veronica species. They create a yellow-brown lobe case of 10–12 mm with a mouth angle of about 80°. Larvae can be found from September to May.

References 

chamaedriella
Moths described in 1852
Moths of Europe